Kumikitang Kabuhayan (English: Profitable Business) is a livelihood program shown early mornings on ABS-CBN in the Philippines. Started in 2003 as Chicken, Pork, Atbp., the program imparts effective tips on how to start a business and make it on the edge. The program also tackles about agriculture and other farming concerns then later retitled in 2003 as Kumikitang Kabuhayan. It is hosted by Peter Musñgi, who provided the voice over talent for ABS-CBN and Vice President of ABS-CBN Sports then later he was replaced by Alex Santos. It ended in 2005.

See also
 Swak na Swak 
 List of programs aired by ABS-CBN

External links
Telebisyon.net

Philippine television shows
2003 Philippine television series debuts
2005 Philippine television series endings
ABS-CBN original programming
ABS-CBN News and Current Affairs shows
Filipino-language television shows